The Tunisian Women's Championship is the top flight of women's association football in Tunisia. It is the women's equivalent of the Ligue 1. The competition is run by the Ligue Nationale du Football Féminin (LNFF) under the auspices of the Tunisian Football Federation.

History
The first Tunisian women's championship was contested in 2004–05 season.

Champions
The list of champions and runners-up:

Most successful clubs

See also 
 Tunisian Women's Cup
 Tunisian Women's Super Cup
 Tunisian Women's League Cup
 National Union of Tunisian Women Cup

References

External links 
 Tunisian Football Federation

 

 
Women's association football leagues in Africa
Women's football competitions in Tunisia
Women
2004 establishments in Tunisia
Sports leagues established in 2004
Football